William Marvin Johnson (June 12, 1936 – September 13, 2020) was an American college football player who was a guard for the Tennessee Volunteers from 1956 to 1957. He was selected by the Football Writers Association of America and the Newspaper Enterprise Association as a first-team guard on their respective 1957 All-America Teams. He was inducted into the Tennessee Sports Hall of Fame in 1980. He died on September 13, 2020.

References 

1936 births
2020 deaths
People from Sparta, Tennessee
American football guards
Tennessee Volunteers football players
Players of American football from Tennessee